The 2022 San Marino Open was a professional tennis tournament played on clay courts. The 29th edition of the tournament, which was part of the 2022 ATP Challenger Tour, took place in City of San Marino, San Marino between 8 and 14 August 2022.

Singles main-draw entrants

Seeds

 1 Rankings are as of 1 August 2022.

Other entrants
The following players received wildcards into the singles main draw:
  Mattia Bellucci
  Flavio Cobolli
  Ernests Gulbis

The following players received entry into the singles main draw as alternates:
  Ivan Gakhov
  Maxime Janvier
  Filip Cristian Jianu

The following players received entry from the qualifying draw:
  Viktor Durasovic
  Francesco Forti
  Lukas Neumayer
  Oleg Prihodko
  Valentin Vacherot
  Alexander Weis

Champions

Singles

 Pavel Kotov def.  Matteo Arnaldi 7–6(7–5), 6–4.

Doubles

 Marco Bortolotti /  Sergio Martos Gornés def.  Ivan Sabanov /  Matej Sabanov 6–4, 6–4.

References

San Marino Open
San Marino GO&FUN Open
San Marino Open
San Marino Open